Anopheles pattoni is a species of mosquito in the Culicidae family. The scientific name of this species was first published in 1926 by Christophers.

References

pattoni
Insects described in 1926